Mohamed "Mo" Messoudi (born 7 January 1984 in Wilrijk) is a retired Belgian footballer of Moroccan descent who last played for K Lyra-Lierse Berlaar.

Career
Messoudi is a player who has made his debut in professional football, being part of the Germinal Beerschot squad in the 2002–03 season, before joining Willem II Tilburg. After being released from Dutch side Willem II, the 25-year-old midfielder returns to Belgium, he has signed a one-year deal with KV Kortrijk.
In 2012, Messoudi moved to Belgian Pro League side Gent where he stayed one season before moving to OH Leuven. In July 2014, Messoudi punched a player in the face during a pre-season friendly match, prompting OH Leuven to fire him the next day. After being cleared from any further charges two weeks later, he signed for Zulte Waregem.

On 10 September 2019, Messoudi joined K Lyra-Lierse Berlaar.

Honours

Club
Beerschot A.C.
 Belgian Cup: 2004–05

References

External links
 
 
 
 

1984 births
Living people
Belgian footballers
Moroccan footballers
Beerschot A.C. players
Willem II (football club) players
K.V. Kortrijk players
K.A.A. Gent players
Oud-Heverlee Leuven players
S.V. Zulte Waregem players
Belgian Pro League players
Challenger Pro League players
Eredivisie players
Belgian expatriate footballers
Expatriate footballers in the Netherlands
Belgian expatriate sportspeople in the Netherlands
Expatriate footballers in Morocco
People from Wilrijk
Belgian sportspeople of Moroccan descent
Raja CA players
K Beerschot VA players
Association football midfielders
Footballers from Antwerp